A Thousand Kisses Deep is the sixth studio album by trumpet player Chris Botti. It was released by Columbia Records on September 13, 2003. Guest vocalists include Chantal Kreviazuk on "The Look of Love" and Bridget Benenate on "Ever Since We Met". The album title comes from the name of the fourth track, "A Thousand Kisses Deep", a cover of the 2001 Leonard Cohen track.

Track listing

Personnel 
 Chris Botti – trumpet (1-11)
 Keefus Ciancia – keyboards (1, 3-6, 8, 9, 10), Moog Voyager bass (1, 2, 8), acoustic piano (10), synth bass (10)
 Mark Goldenberg – keyboards (1), drum programming (1)
 Steve Lindsey – acoustic piano (1, 3, 5, 11), keyboards (1, 3, 5, 6, 9, 10), Wurlitzer electric piano (2), shaker (9)
 Printz Board – synthesizers (2), drum programming (2, 3, 5, 10)
 Jim Cox – keyboards (3, 8), Fender Rhodes (8)
 Matthew Gerrard – keyboards (5, 6), bass (5), drum programming (5, 6), synthesizers (6), electric guitar (6)
 Billy Childs – acoustic piano (7)
 Dean Parks – guitar (2, 4, 5, 10), acoustic guitar (3, 6, 9)
 Smokey Hormel – electric guitar (3, 9)
 Doyle Bramhall – guitar (8)
 Mike Elizondo – bass (3, 9)
 Chuck Berghofer – bass (4), additional acoustic guitar (5)
 Joey Waronker – additional drums (2), drums (4, 9)
 Abe Laboriel, Jr. – hi-hat (2, 10), additional drums (6)
 Lenny Castro – percussion (5, 6), bongos (8)
 Bob Sheppard – tenor saxophone (2)
 Mort Lindsey – string arrangements and conductor (3)
 Chantal Kreviazuk – vocals (3)
 Bridget Benenate – vocals (5)

Production 
 Steve Lindsey – producer 
 Joe Chiccarelli – engineer
 David Ashton – assistant engineer, additional recording
 Matthew Gerrard – additional recording
 Gabe Veltri – additional recording
 Dave Way – mixing
 Lior Goldenberg – mix assistant
 Robert Hadley – mastering
 Doug Sax – mastering
 Jolie Levine – production coordinator
 Mary Maurer – art direction, design 
 Fabrizio Ferri – photography
 Marc Silag – management 
Studios
 Mixed at Scream Studios (Studio City, California).
 Mastered at The Mastering Lab (Hollywood, California).

Charts

References

Chris Botti albums
2003 albums
Columbia Records albums
Instrumental albums